The West Fork Smith River is a tributary, about  long, of the Smith River in Douglas County in the U.S. state of Oregon. It begins in the Central Oregon Coast Range near Roman Nose Mountain and flows generally south to meet the larger river  from its confluence with the Umpqua River near Reedsport. The entire course of the river lies within the Siuslaw National Forest.

The river supports populations of Chinook and coho salmon, steelhead, cutthroat trout, and lamprey. Fishing in Oregon, a sportfishing guide, describes the river as "a beautiful wild trout stream".

Degraded in past decades by logging, splash dams, and in-stream debris removal, the stream has been chosen for restoration. Using grant money from the state, the Partnership for Umpqua Rivers has been placing thousands of boulders in the streambed to improve the spawning, rearing, and refugia habitat for fish. The project involves a  stretch of the river.

Tributaries
The named tributaries of the West Fork Smith River from source to mouth are  Gold, Beaver, Moore, Crane, and Coon creeks.

See also
 List of rivers of Oregon

References

External links
Umpqua Watershed Council

Rivers of Oregon
Rivers of Douglas County, Oregon
Oregon Coast Range